Women Go on Forever is a 1931 American pre-Code drama film directed by Walter Lang and starring Clara Kimball Young. It was adapted from the 1927 play of the same name starring Mary Boland and James Cagney.

Cast
 Clara Kimball Young as Daisy Bowman
 Marian Nixon as Betty
 Paul Page as Eddie
 Thomas E. Jackson as Detective
 Yola d'Avril as Pearl
 Morgan Wallace as Jake
 Maurice Black as Pete
 Maurice Murphy as Tommy

See also
List of lost films

References

External links
 

1931 films
1931 drama films
American drama films
American black-and-white films
Films directed by Walter Lang
Tiffany Pictures films
1930s English-language films
1930s American films